San Miguel de Asile was a Spanish Franciscan mission built in the early 17th century in the Florida Panhandle, near the present-day town of Lamont, Florida. It was part of Spain's effort to colonize the region, and convert the Timucua and Apalachee people to Christianity. The mission served a local chiefdom of the Timucua people known as the Yustaga. It lasted until the first decade of the 18th century, when it was destroyed, possibly by Creek Indians and the English.

The site where the mission stood was added to the U.S. National Register of Historic Places on December 17, 1974.

The archaeological site was first discovered and investigated by B. Calvin Jones between 1968 and 1972. Jones concluded that the site was that of San Miguel de Asile. More recent archaeological work and research by Alissa Slade casts doubt on Jones's theory. Slade's research indicates the site was not San Miguel de Asile, a Timucuan mission, but rather an Apalachee mission, possibly San Lorenzo de Ivitachuco.

References

External links
 Jefferson County listings at National Register of Historic Places
 Jefferson County listings at Florida's Office of Cultural and Historical Programs

Apalachee
Archaeological sites in Florida
National Register of Historic Places in Jefferson County, Florida
Properties of religious function on the National Register of Historic Places in Florida
Spanish missions in Florida
Timucua